The Dover Post is a weekly newspaper and online website published in Dover, Delaware.

The parent company of The Dover Post is GateHouse Media, a U.S. newspaper publisher, headquartered in Fairport, New York, that publishes 97 dailies in 20 states and 198 paid weeklies, in addition to free papers, shoppers and specialty and niche publications. GateHouse Media bought The Dover Post from Jim Flood, Sr. in 2008.

Dover, Delaware
Newspapers established in 1975
Weekly newspapers published in the United States
Newspapers published in Delaware
1975 establishments in Delaware